The Bartell mechanism is a pseudorotational mechanism similar to the Berry mechanism. It occurs only in molecules with a pentagonal bipyramidal molecular geometry, such as IF7. This mechanism was first predicted by H. B. Bartell. The mechanism exchanges the axial atoms with one pair of the equatorial atoms with an energy requirement of about 2.7 kcal/mol. Similarly to the Berry mechanism in square planar molecules, the symmetry of the intermediary phase of the vibrational mode is "chimeric" of other mechanisms; it displays characteristics of the Berry mechanism, a "lever" mechanism seen in pseudorotation of disphenoidal molecules, and a "turnstile" mechanism (which can be seen in trigonal bipyramidal molecules under certain conditions).

References

See also 
 Pseudorotation
 Bailar twist
 Berry mechanism
 Ray–Dutt twist
 Fluxional molecule

Molecular geometry
Reaction mechanisms